Christopher Robert Bear (born July 19, 1982) is a drummer and multi-instrumentalist member of the Brooklyn-based indie-rock group Grizzly Bear.

Bear joined the group with singer Ed Droste for contributions on their first record, Horn of Plenty. He also contributed to Earl Greyhound's self-titled EP in 2004. Bear worked with fellow Grizzly Bear bandmates Daniel Rossen and Chris Taylor on Rossen's project Department of Eagles, contributing drums to their sophomore album, In Ear Park.

In addition to his continuing work with Grizzly Bear, Bear was briefly a member of Dirty Projectors. Bear continues developing his independent career most recently working on arranging soundtracks for the HBO series High Maintenance. Bear has also performed live and recorded drums with the band Beach House, and contributed drums and percussion on 9 out of 15 tracks on the 2020 album Shore by Fleet Foxes. Bear also records under his solo project Fools. He released his first solo album Fools' Harp Vol.1 in May 2020. Bear would once again work with Grizzly Bear bandmate Daniel Rossen on his debut solo album, which he confirmed through his Instagram page in April 2021.

References

American rock drummers
1982 births
Living people
American indie pop musicians
21st-century American drummers
Grizzly Bear (band) members